There are two species of skink named Lanza's writhing skink:

 Mochlus grandisonianus, found in Somalia
 Mochlus paedocarinatus, found in Somalia and Ethiopia

Reptile common names